Honeyville is a city near the eastern edge of Box Elder County, Utah, United States. The population was 1,441 at the 2010 census.

History
Honeyville was first established in 1861 when a ferry was put across the Bear River at this location. In that same year Anson Call built a sawmill in Honeyville. He later sold the mill to Abraham Hunsaker. The place was known as Hunsaker's Mill until it was organized as an LDS ward named Honeyville in 1877. Hunsaker was the branch president at Hunsaker's Mill and then the bishop of the Honeyville Ward until 1889.

Geography
Honeyville is located in eastern Box Elder County and is bordered by Deweyville to the north, by the Bear River to the west, by Calls Fort to the south, and by the Rocky Mountains to the east.

Interstate highways 15 and 84 run through the western side of the city, with access from Exit 372.

Demographics

As of the census of 2000, there were 1,214 people, 358 households, and 308 families residing in the city. The population density was 103.3 people per square mile (39.9/km2). There were 378 housing units at an average density of 32.2 per square mile (12.4/km2). The racial makeup of the city was 94.32% White, 0.08% Native American, 2.80% Asian, 1.48% from other races, and 1.32% from two or more races. Hispanic or Latino of any race were 5.27% of the population.

There were 358 households, out of which 48.0% had children under the age of 18 living with them, 74.0% were married couples living together, 8.9% had a female householder with no husband present, and 13.7% were non-families. 12.3% of all households were made up of individuals, and 5.9% had someone living alone who was 65 years of age or older. The average household size was 3.39 and the average family size was 3.72.

In the city, the population was spread out, with 36.7% under the age of 18, 9.6% from 18 to 24, 24.4% from 25 to 44, 18.1% from 45 to 64, and 11.2% who were 65 years of age or older. The median age was 30 years. For every 100 females, there were 103.7 males. For every 100 females age 18 and over, there were 100.3 males.

The median income for a household in the city was $41,618, and the median income for a family was $46,786. Males had a median income of $35,625 versus $21,250 for females. The per capita income for the city was $15,050. About 5.0% of families and 6.4% of the population were below the poverty line, including 6.6% of those under age 18 and 2.9% of those age 65 or over.

Schools
In May 2000, Honeyville Elementary was shut down and merged with Century Elementary, located in Bear River City. There are currently no operating schools in Honeyville.

See also

 List of cities and towns in Utah

References

External links

 

Populated places established in 1861
Cities in Box Elder County, Utah
Cities in Utah
1861 establishments in Utah Territory